This is a list of heads of state of Albania who have served since the Declaration of Independence of 1912.

Since the collapse of the communist regime in 1991, the head of state of Albania is the president of the republic. The president is indirectly elected to a five-year term and is limited to a maximum of two terms, as specified by the Constitution. As in most parliamentary systems, the president is now by-and-large a ceremonial office, with the prime minister de facto heading the executive branch.

Heads of state

Monarchs

Chairmen of the Presidium

First Secretaries

Presidents

Acting heads of state

See also 
 List of Albanian monarchs
 President of Albania

References

External links 
 A brief history of the institution

Albania
Politics of Albania